John Saracenus was the Dean of Wells during 1250.

References

Deans of Wells